The urban agglomeration of Quebec City is an urban agglomeration in Quebec. It may also be referred to as the urban agglomeration of the city of Québec.

It consists of:
 Quebec City (Central municipality)
 L'Ancienne-Lorette
 Saint-Augustin-de-Desmaures

That is, it consists of the elements of the amalgamated city of Quebec City as it existed after amalgamation on January 1, 2002, including the two municipalities that chose to de-merge on January 1, 2006.

It differs from the census division of Quebec City in that the census division includes the Indian reserve of Wendake and the parish municipality of Notre-Dame-des-Anges, which are enclaves of Quebec City but do not belong to the agglomeration.

See also
 Urban agglomerations of Quebec
 Municipal reorganization in Quebec
 Municipal history of Quebec
 Communauté métropolitaine de Québec

Quebec City